The Wings Tour, also known as 2017 BTS Live Trilogy Episode III (Final Chapter): The Wings Tour, was the second worldwide concert tour headlined by the South Korean boy band BTS to promote their second Korean studio album, Wings (2016). The tour began on February 18, 2017 and concluded on December 10, 2017 in South Korea. It visited 12 countries including Brazil, Australia, Japan, Hong Kong (city), and the United States. The tour gathered 550,000 fans, making it the band's second biggest tour to date.

Background
On November 18, 2016, BTS released a trailer on YouTube announcing the tour, along with a poster listing the dates for the first two shows held at Gocheok Sky Dome in South Korea. Later, six shows were confirmed in five cities in Chile, Brazil, and the United States.

Tickets for the North American leg sold out within a few minutes. Due to high demand, two additional shows were added for the Prudential Center and the Honda Center. Over 60,000 fans were in attendance at the concerts in Newark, Chicago, and Anaheim. The group went on to sell out their concert in Chile, and became the fastest K-pop group to sell out the Movistar Arena, Chile's largest indoor arena. According to Puntoticket, the Chilean ticket sales and distribution company, BTS' concert was the fastest-selling show in Chile's history, only comparable to Maroon 5’s concert in 2015, selling more than 10,000 tickets in less than 2 hours. On January 13, 2017, BTS announced a second show at the same venue. In Brazil, more than 50,000 fans tried to buy the 14,000 available tickets, which led to protests on Twitter asking for the Brazilian promoters of the tour to move the concerts to a larger venue. BTS sold 44,000 tickets in total across the South American leg of the tour.

On July 27, 2017, BTS announced three finale concerts held in Seoul at Gocheok Sky Dome on December 8–10, 2017. On September 2, 2017, additional dates at Japan's Kyocera Dome were announced for October 14–15, 2017, which were later sold out. It was the first time that the group held dome concerts in Japan since their debut.

Reception
The tour received positive reviews from music critics. Billboard praised the group's "militarily precise choreography". They also complimented the members' solo stages, stating that "The solitary, reflective showcases moved the audience".  Bucks County Courier Times wrote that the concert, which "included elaborate dance routines for almost every song, stunning intermission videos and plenty of speeches and antics from the BTS members", was an "incredible experience". Idolator highlighted the band's intricate choreography as well as each member's ability to showcase their respective strengths through solo stages. They concluded, "The Wings Tour is the perfect introduction to the professionalism and pageantry of K-Pop. BTS is in a league of their own and the world is starting to realize it". CNN acknowledged BTS as the first K-pop act to sell out arenas in the United States, praising their evolution in the industry.

The New York Times Magazine reported on the remarkable success of The Wings Tour in Chile, which sold out in record time. It was revealed that "the band’s online popularity had become so entrenched in Chile that tour promoters didn’t even bother with a traditional media push". It was also reported that the audience's screams alone reached "an earsplitting 127 decibels", the loudest ever recorded at the Movistar Arena. Manila Bulletin praised the group's performances and noted the impressive attendance numbers for the show, stating "BTS’ drawing power is no joke".

The Grammys reported on BTS' first dome concerts in Osaka, highlighting that BTS "drew impressive crowds and delivered smashing performances".

Set lists
{{hidden
| headercss = background: #ccccff; font-size: 100%; width: 75%;
| contentcss = text-align: left; font-size: 100%; width: 75%;
| header = The Wings Tour on February 18, 2017 in Seoul
| content = 

Below is a setlist showing what numbers BTS decided to perform.
 "Not Today"
 "Am I Wrong"
 "Silver Spoon"
 "Dope"
 "Begin" (Jungkook's solo)
 "Lie" (Jimin's solo)
 "First Love" (Suga's solo)
 "Lost" (Jin, Jimin, V, Jungkook)
 "Save Me"
 "I Need U"
 "Reflection" (RM's solo)
 "Stigma" (V's solo)
 "MAMA" (J-Hope's solo)
 "Awake" (Jin's solo)
 "BTS Cypher Pt. 4" (RM, Suga, J-Hope)
 "Fire"
 "N.O"
 "No More Dream"
 "Boy In Luv"
 "Danger"
 "Run"
 "War of Hormone"
 "21st Century Girl"
 "Intro: Boy Meets Evil" (J-Hope's solo)
 "Blood Sweat & Tears"
Encore
 "Outro: Wings"
 "2! 3! (Still Wishing For Better Days)"
 "Spring Day"

}}
{{hidden
| headercss = background: #ccccff; font-size: 100%; width: 75%;
| contentcss = text-align: left; font-size: 100%; width: 75%;
| header = The Wings Tour Final on December 8–10, 2017 in Seoul.
| content = 

 "MIC Drop"
 "We Are Bulletproof Pt. 1"
 "We Are Bulletproof Pt. 2"
 "Hip Hop Lover" 
 "BTS Cypher Pt. 1" (RM, Suga, J-Hope)
 "BTS Cypher Pt. 2: Triptych" (RM, Suga, J-Hope)
 "BTS Cypher Pt. 3: Killer" (RM, Suga, J-Hope)
 "BTS Cypher Pt. 4" (RM, Suga, J-Hope)
 "Begin" (Jungkook's solo)
 "Lie" (Jimin's solo)
 "First Love" (Suga's solo)
 "So Far Away" (Jin, Jimin, V, Jungkook)
 "Lost" (Jin, Jimin, V, Jungkook)
 "Save Me"
 "I Need U"
 "Reflection" (RM's solo)
 "Stigma" (V's solo)
 "MAMA" (J-Hope's solo)
 "Awake" (Jin's solo)
 "DNA"
 "Go Go"
 "N.O"
 "No More Dream"
 "Boy in Luv"
 "Danger"
 "Fire"
 "Run"
 "Blood, Sweat & Tears"
Encore
 "A Supplementary Story: You Never Walk Alone"
 "Best of Me"
 "Path"
 "Born Singer"
 "Spring Day"
 "Outro: Wings"
}}

Tour dates

Box office score data

TV Broadcasts

Accolades

Notes

References

2017 concert tours
BTS concert tours
Concert tours of Asia
Concert tours of South America
Concert tours of North America
Concert tours of Oceania
Concert tours of South Korea
Concert tours of the United States
Concert tours of Thailand
Concert tours of Indonesia
Concert tours of the Philippines
Concert tours of Hong Kong
Concert tours of Australia
Concert tours of Japan
Concert tours of Taiwan
Concert tours of China